Kevin Wu (born June 12, 1990) is a Chinese-born American YouTuber best known under the username KevJumba. The San Francisco Chronicle's Jeff Yang has noted that Wu is not a comedian in the conventional sense but that by "just talking [he] is, well, pretty hilarious" due to his deadpan vocal delivery, animated facial expressions and tendency toward unexpected digressions.

Wu previously appeared on The CW Television Network's short-lived Online Nation and co-starred with Jessica Lee Rose and Philip DeFranco in Hooking Up from HBOLabs (the online arm of HBO) in 2008. In 2010, Wu and his father, Michael, competed as a team on the 17th season of The Amazing Race, placing seventh out of eleven teams. In 2014, Wu starred in crime drama film Revenge of the Green Dragons (executive produced by Martin Scorsese). In 2013, Wu ceased production of YouTube content. In 2016, Wu returned for a brief period of time on social media. In November 2020, Wu created an account on Twitch, originally titled cybermuse.

Background
Wu was born on June 12, 1990, in Houston, Texas. His father, Michael Wu, a Taiwanese immigrant, is a computer engineer. Wu graduated from Clements High School in Sugar Land, Texas in 2008 and attended the University of California, Davis for two years before dropping out. He was living in downtown Los Angeles while in the entertainment business but later relocated back to Houston.

Wu was severely injured in a car crash in June 2015. In May 2019, Wu completed his bachelor's degree in psychology at the University of Houston.

YouTube career
Wu was known for posting humorous videos on YouTube. When Wu's "I Have to Deal With Stereotypes" video was featured on YouTube's home page, his number of viewers began to increase. In this video, Wu talks about stereotypes he has to deal with as an Asian-American. He tries to disprove his cheapness by bragging about the recent purchase of a "brand new, top-of-the-line, TI-84 calculator". He acknowledges that this might make him nerdy but dismisses this stereotype too as he does not "make all A's...in school today [he] made a B+." He is then greeted by a voice that was supposed to be his mother calling him a loser and accusing him of dishonoring their family. Wu goes on to say he can prove his predominant social life with the constant ringing of his cell phone. At this point, his phone indeed rings, he answers it, and the voice on the other end to Wu's disappointment says, "Hey, why did you tell me to call you?" Wu has collaborated with fellow YouTube comedian Christine Gambito (HappySlip), making five videos with her.

Following his video, "Butthash Hero", Wu introduced his father, PapaJumba, onto his YouTube channel, and his father made several appearances in candid video clips taken by his son. Responding to Wu's father's growing popularity among viewers, his father made a debut in "I Love My Dad", and has been featured alongside his son many times since.

Background 
Wu began uploading videos onto Youtube during his junior year of high school. On February 26, 2008, the Los Angeles Times compared the web series Quarterlife's viewership to Wu's. At the time Wu was a "semi-well known YouTube blogger" and had received 450,000 views for a video describing how he broke his shin. Quarterlife, which had been picked up by NBC, had received only 100,000 views on MySpace and 50,000 views on YouTube. By May 29, 2008, Wu had become one of three East Asians under the age of 21 to be in the top five of YouTube's all-time most subscribed users with 187,000 subscribers and more than 5.9 million views. By June 5, 2008, he had become the number one subscribed comedian on YouTube, and third most subscribed uploader overall. Wu's videos have received replies from Ella Koon, Jessica Alba, and Baron Davis.

In 2008, Davis created a "longest stare" contest for ibeatyou.com, a site that he and Alba's husband Cash Warren co-founded. The contest began with Davis challenging Wu, who then challenged Alba, who responded to the challenge. In 2011, Wu began performing with Yesterday, Today, Forever (YTF) along with other YouTube personalities. The group performed their first concert on October 9, 2011 in Honolulu, Hawaii. In June 2012, Wu began starring in YouTube videos on a new channel called YOMYOMF. He stars in his own series titled KevJumba Takes All.

As of September 27, 2013, KevJumba has remained inactive with no new uploads to the channel.
As of August 2014, Wu had more than 3,000,000 subscribers and more than 350 million combined views on the videos in his main channel. His combined video views total over 343.9 million. In early 2016, Wu privatized his videos on the KevJumba account, disabling all content to the public. However, the 35 videos on Wu's JumbaFund channel are still public. The privatized videos were later released again back to the public. He eventually uploaded two new videos titled "Hope." and "YOUTH REPRESENT" LIVE (Internet Power!)" in March 2017.

Funemployed
The web series Funemployed, launched in the summer of 2010, stars Wu and Philip Wang of Wong Fu Productions and includes other notable YouTube stars such as Nigahiga, David Choi, Kina Grannis, and Chester See. With the large number of fans, this series quickly took off and became a hit, reaching 500,000 viewers in only a few weeks. The series focuses on two good friends named Kyle (Wu) and Jason (Philip Wang), and how they are dealing with unemployment after Jason is laid off at work. Kyle is characterized as the typical laid back guy, who comes off as somewhat of a slacker, while Jason is characterized as the more studious hard worker of the two. The two eventually come up with an idea of how to make money, believing that YouTube is the key, an allusion to Wu's and Wang's real life success with YouTube videos. Funemployed eventually came to an end on July 27, 2010, with their last episode entitled, "Gave it a Shot". There were a total of eleven episodes.

JumbaFund 
Wu launched the JumbaFund Youtube channel in 2009 with the mission of donating all of its earnings to a charity that viewers suggested. Wu mentions this in his video and always records himself donating all the profits to the charity in order to show the viewers that his JumbaFund charity is not used for anything but to donate to the needy.

In 2011, Wu was invited by the nonprofit The Supply to teach English in Nairobi, Kenya. Wu uploaded the videos from his trip onto the Jumbafund channel upon his return to the US and donated over $5,000 in ad revenue to The Supply. The nonprofit in turn used the funds to finance the construction of the then titled "Jumba Lenana Academy" secondary school in the Lenana neighborhood where Wu volunteered. Jumbafund, up until this point, donated to various charities, such as the Red Cross and St. Jude Children's Research Hospital. However, in February 2012, Wu has stated that he will dedicate the channel's annual revenue entirely to completing the Jumba Lenana Academy. The school was finished in 2013 and renamed "KevJumba High School". Jumbafund ended up donating more than $50,000 to the construction of the school and Wu has expressed his intent to continue covering the facility's operational costs.

After YouTube
On April 21, 2016, Wu resurfaced on social media after an almost three-year absence as he made a blog titled "Monk.College". Wu said on his blog that he left YouTube so he could meditate (having taken an interest in transcendental meditation) and go to college. According to his blog, Wu currently resides in Houston, Texas. In August 2016, Wu privatized "Monk.College" for unspecified reasons. In March 2017, Wu made his first public appearance at Youth Represent the World Concert in Stafford, Texas, and opened up about his car accident to the public for the first time. After another three-year hiatus, Wu started streaming on Twitch. Wu hosted the Twitch livestream portion of the annual music festival Head in the Clouds in 2021 and 2022.

Other works
In 2007, Wu appeared on The CW's short-lived Online Nation. Online Nation compiled an hour of web clips, broadcast them during primetime, lasting four episodes. Wu, along with other popular YouTube personalities, is also paid to broadcast a streaming show on BlogTV. He has been a member of BlogTV since March 29, 2008, and as of November 2, 2008, he had produced 70 live and 23 recorded shows with over 300,000 viewers of the live show and 100,000 viewers of the recorded shows.

As of October 2008, Wu starred with Jessica Rose and Phillip DeFranco in Hooking Up from HBOLabs (the online arm of HBO), a scripted 10-episode web-based series. Hooking Up is set at a fictional university where the students spend most of their time emailing and twittering, but still manage to miscommunicate. It is his first work on a scripted production. Guest appearances on Hooking Up will be made by Kevin Nalty, Michael Buckley, and other internet celebrities. The entire cast of Hooking Up is composed of YouTube video bloggers in the hope of attracting a young, internet knowledgeable audience. By the show's second day on YouTube, it had received more than 450,000 views. According to NewTeeVee.com, an evolving consensus is that for an online video to be a hit, somewhere between 100,000 and one million views are needed, giving Hooking Up a strong start. Maria Russo of the Los Angeles Times felt that Wu was better looking than star DeFranco and wondered why Wu plays the "tired role of the East Asian friend who helps the white guy get the chicks," while Bobbie Johnson of The Guardian said that many web surfers had "scoffed at what they see as a cynical attempt to cash in." On October 2, 2011, Wu hosted "Flicks" on Cartoon Network during an airing of Around the World in 80 Days. Wu has also announced he would be starring in the independent film Rock Jocks with Justin Chon, Felicia Day, and Gerry Bedknob, which was released in 2012.

In 2011, Wu sponsored Brian Wong in the NASCAR K&N Pro Series West, who raced a car with Wu's paint scheme in the Casino Arizona 125 at Phoenix International Raceway.

Wu was honored by East West Players, the oldest Asian Pacific American (APA) theatre company in the United States, for helping to increase the presence of APA's in the arts and entertainment at their 47th Visionary Award in 2013. Tim Dang, the Producing Artistic Director of East West Players at the time, called Wu "a great example of the 'next generation' taking the lead to raise the visibility of Asian Americans through new media and the art of comedy."

The Amazing Race
In May and June 2010, Wu participated with his father in filming for the 17th season of The Amazing Race, an American reality television game show. Upon this announcement, it was also the first time his dad's name, Michael, was revealed, which was kept anonymous since his debut. Wu officially announced his participation on Facebook on September 1, and on YouTube a week later. The season premiered on September 26, 2010. Michael and Kevin's best placement was a third-place finish in Leg 2 and Leg 6. Their worst placement was a last place finish (9th) in Leg 3, a non-elimination leg. They ended up in seventh place and were eliminated in Leg 7 after being issued two 30-minute penalties for using a cab to travel between tasks on the leg when they were instructed to walk; another team had also issued a similar penalty and checked in after them, but only had one half-hour penalty, resulting in Kevin and Michael's elimination.

Hang Loose
Wu began working on a film with Dante Basco and Kinetic Films LLC in late 2011. In December 2012, Wu released his first full-length feature film, Hang Loose.

Hang Loose is a comedy in which Wu, who stars as himself, goes to Hawaii for his sister's wedding but finds himself on a misadventure with his future brother-in-law (played by Dante Basco) that changes his life. Other notable actors in the film include frequent collaborator Justin Chon as the main antagonist, BJ.

Filmography
 Hang Loose (2012)
 Rock Jocks (2012)
 Revenge of the Green Dragons (2014)
 Man Up (2015)
 Twinsters (2015)

See also
 History of the Chinese Americans in Houston

References

External links

 KevJumba at YouTube
 

1990 births
Living people
American male comedians
21st-century American comedians
American male actors of Taiwanese descent
American Buddhists
Converts to Buddhism
People from Galveston, Texas
People from Sugar Land, Texas
The Amazing Race (American TV series) contestants
YouTube channels
YouTubers from Texas
American male actors of Chinese descent
University of California, Davis alumni
University of Houston alumni
Twitch (service) streamers